Portillo is a ski resort in South America, located in the Andes mountains of Chile. Ski Portillo has 35 named runs and 14 lifts. It is owned and operated by the Purcell family who have a chain of hotels in Chile, most noticeably the Tierra Hotels including Tierra Atacama in San Pedro de Atacama.

Plans to build the ski area were drawn up in the 1930s. Construction began in 1942 and the ski area was opened in 1949. Several of the ski lifts on the west side of the valley were destroyed by avalanches in 1965 and were rebuilt in time for Portillo to host the Alpine World Ski Championships in August 1966. Those championships marked the emergence of Jean-Claude Killy, who won gold medals in the downhill and combined events. Portillo has since become one of the principal destinations for ski racers to train during the northern hemisphere summer and hosts the national ski teams of Austria, Italy, and the United States.

Location
Portillo lies close to the border between Chile and Argentina at Paso Los Libertadores.

Season
The ski season at Portillo typically runs from mid-June to early-October, conditions permitting.

References

External links

Chile - Portillo Ski Resort / Overview

Ski areas and resorts in Chile
Sports venues in Valparaíso Region